Otago is a region in the South Island of New Zealand. It contains numerous rural primary schools, several small town primary and secondary schools, and some big city schools in Dunedin.
In New Zealand schools, students begin formal education in Year 1 at the age of five. Year 13 is the final year of secondary education. Years 14 and 15 refer to adult education facilities. 
State schools are those fully funded by the government and at which no fees for tuition of domestic students (i.e. New Zealand citizens and permanent residents, and Australian citizens) can be charged, although a donation is commonly requested. A state integrated school is a former private school with a special character based on a religious or philosophical belief that has been integrated into the state system. State integrated schools charge "attendance dues" to cover the building and maintenance of school buildings, which are not owned by the government, but otherwise they like state schools cannot charge fees for tuition of domestic students but may request a donation. As Dunedin was founded by Presbyterian Scottish settlers there are a Presbyterian girls' and boys' school in the city. Private schools charge fees to its students for tuition, as do state and state integrated schools for tuition of international students. Unlike other major cities in New Zealand, Dunedin does not have any private intermediate or high schools. All remaining private intermediate and high schools have been integrated into the state system.

The socioeconomic decile indicates the socioeconomic status of the school's 'zone' (or catchment) area. A decile of 1 indicates the school draws from a poor area; a decile of 10 indicates the school draws from a well-off area. The decile ratings used here come from the Ministry of Education Te Kete Ipurangi website and from the decile change spreadsheet listed in the references. The deciles were last revised using information from the 2006 Census. The roll of each school changes frequently as students start school for the first time, move between schools, and graduate. The rolls given here are those provided by the Ministry of Education are based on figures from  The Ministry of Education institution number links to the Education Counts page for each school.

Waitaki District

Former schools
Otepopo School in Herbert closed in September 2010 after 146 years of operation.

Flag Swamp School northwest of Waikouaiti closed in mid-2020, after celebrating its 150th anniversary the previous year.

Central Otago District

Queenstown-Lakes District

Dunedin City

Primary and intermediate schools

Secondary and composite schools

Former schools
 Brighton School, Brighton, merged with Ocean View School to form Big Rock Primary School, July 2008.
 Calton Hill School, Caversham School, and College Street School, merged on the Caversham site, with a satellite campus at the Calton Hill site, in January 2012 to form Carisbrook School.
 Corstorphine School, closed July 2010 due to declining roll numbers.
 Forbury School and Macandrew Intermediate merged on the Macandrew Intermediate site in January 2012 to form Bathgate Park School.
 High Street School, Dunedin, closed February 2011 due to declining roll numbers.
 King Edward Technical College, closed 1974 and replaced with Logan Park High School.
 Momona School, Henley School merged with Outram School in 2004.
 Moreau College, merged with St Paul's High School in 1989 to form Kavanagh College.
 Ocean View School, Ocean View, closed and merged with Brighton School to form Big Rock Primary School, July 2008.
 Rotary Park School, Waverley – state contributing primary, closed 2012. 
 St Patrick's School, closed April 2011 due to declining roll numbers.
 Tomahawk School, closed April 2010 due to declining roll numbers.
 Waldronville School, closed April 2010 due to declining roll numbers.

Clutha District

Notes

References
General
Te Kete Ipurangi Ministry of Education website
ERO school and early childhood education reports Education Review Office
Decile change 2007 to 2008 for state & state integrated schools

Specific

External links
Dunedin Schools in Google Maps

 
Otago